William Douglas Caröe (1 September 1857–25 February 1938) was a British architect, particularly of churches.

Early life
Caröe was born on 1 September 1857 in Holmsdale, Blundellsands near Liverpool, the youngest son of the Danish Consul in Liverpool, Anders Kruuse Caröe (d. 1897) and Jane Kirkpatrick Green (d. 1877). He was educated at Ruabon Grammar School in Denbighshire, Wales before Trinity College, Cambridge, as a senior optime, in the mathematical tripos of 1879 and graduated with a BA in the same year. Caröe was articled to John Loughborough Pearson and wrote the article on Pearson in the Encyclopædia Britannica, (11th ed., 1911).

He married Grace Desborough (d.1947), with whom he had two sons and a daughter. The couple's elder son was (Sir) Olaf Kirkpatric Kruuse Caröe (1892–1981), who became an Indian administrator; then came a daughter, Christian Desborough Caröe (1894–1973); and finally a second son, Alban Douglas Rendall Caröe (1904–1991), who followed his father’s footsteps in architecture.

Biography

William Douglas Caröe was a major figure in the Arts and Crafts Movement and described as a “Master of spatial painting”. The firm he founded, Caroe & Partners, still specialises in ecclesiastical architecture, especially the restoration of historic churches.

Caröe was architect to numerous ecclesiastical buildings including St David's and Durham Cathedrals, and Tewkesbury and Romsey Abbeys. Although Caröe primarily made his name in church architecture, he was also the architect for the Main Building of Cardiff University, inspired by his alma mater Trinity College, Cambridge.

Caröe designed additions to his country house, Vann in Hambledon, Surrey. The house was featured in the TV series The Curious House Guest in 2006.

No. 1 Millbank, London, was built for the Church Commissioners in 1903.

See also
:Category:Buildings by W. D. Caröe

Gallery

References

Bibliography
Jennifer M. Freeman (1991) W. D. Caroe: His Architectural Achievement

External links

Caroe & Partners
Entry in the Oxford Dictionary of National Biography

1857 births
1938 deaths
People educated at Ruabon Grammar School
Alumni of Trinity College, Cambridge
Members of the Cambrian Archaeological Association
British ecclesiastical architects
People from Crosby, Merseyside
English people of Danish descent
Architects from Lancashire